The 2015 Derby City Council election took place on 7 May 2015 to elect members of the Derby City Council in England. It was held on the same day as other local elections. The Labour Party increased its majority on the council by gaining two seats.

Election results

All comparisons in vote share are to the corresponding 2011 election.

Ward results

Abbey

Allestree

Alvaston

Arboretum

Blagreaves

Boulton

Chaddesden

Chellaston

Darley

Derwent

Littleover

Mackworth

Note: Lisa Higginbottom was elected as a Labour councillor at the previous election in 2011, but resigned to sit as an independent in October 2013.

Mickleover

Normanton

Oakwood

Sinfin

Spondon

References

2015 English local elections
May 2015 events in the United Kingdom
2015
2010s in Derby